The  Florida State University Marching Chiefs is the official marching band of the Florida State University. The band has served in this capacity since the 1940s and continues to perform at all home football games as well as several away games each year. There are 420+ members, or Chiefs, as members are sometimes known, in the band who hail from almost every academic department within the university.

History
The first appearance of a formal band was organized in the late 1930s by Charlotte Cooper, Jean Hitchcolk, Allice Ludlaw, and director Owen F. Sellars. The band, which consisted of less than twenty students, performed at the Odds and Evens intramural football game on Thanksgiving Day 1939 (Observed November 30). The following year the Florida Flambeau ran an announcement of try-outs for the now established band.  In 1942 Sellars took military leave for World War II and Frank Sykora became the interim director. The same year uniforms were purchased and worn for the first time at the inauguration of Doak S. Campbell as the new college president. 1946 saw the first option for students to take marching band for credit.

In 1947 the Florida State College for Women officially became Florida State University and the university was changed to coeducational by an act of the Florida Legislature.  With the change to a coed school came the introduction of a male football team which competed in a five-game season. The marching band performed at the games and practiced on Landis Green under Robert Smith.

1949 saw a new director for the band, Robert T. Braunagel, and the new, official name of "Marching Chiefs."  The name was chosen by a newspaper survey sponsored by the Student Government Association. The first appearance of the newly christened Marching Chiefs was at Stetson University. Dr. Manley R Whitcomb became the new director of the Marching Chiefs in 1953 after transferring from Ohio State University and joining the FSU faculty.  Dr. Whitcomb brought with him a talented young arranger by the name of Charles Carter who became the official arranger of the Marching Chiefs. Carter's arrangements gave the Marching Chiefs a distinctive style that survives to this day.  Whitcomb also brought with him the traditional eight-to-five step, fast marching tempos, and the high step with arm swing now known as "Chief Step."

The 1949-50 football season saw the Seminoles' and the Marching Chief's first appearances in a postseason bowl game at the Cigar Bowl in Tampa, FL.  1954 marked the Seminoles next appearance in a bowl at the Sun Bowl in El Paso, Texas.  The Miami Daily News proclaimed, "FSU's bid to Sun Bowl clinched by Marching Chiefs." In the spring of 1955 FSU received a charter of Kappa Kappa Psi honorary band fraternity and Tau Beta Sigma honorary band sorority. The brothers/sisters of KKPsi and TBS, as the organizations are commonly known, produced a newsletter named The Chieftain which aimed to keep band members informed of upcoming events and activities. In 1956 Charlie Carter arranged J. Dayton Smith's The Hymn to the Garnet and the Gold for band. The Charlie Carter arrangement had its premier performance at the 1958 homecoming game.

The in-state American football rivalry between Florida State and UF began with their first meeting in 1958 but it was not until 1964 that a standing home-and-away series was launched.

1969 saw the beginning of a new tradition for the Marching Chiefs with the newly created Band Alumni Association (Now FSU Marching Chiefs Alumni) putting graduates of the Marching Chiefs onto the field for halftime.

In 1971 Richard Mayo, an FSU alumnus and former drum major, take over direction of the Chiefs in a year in which membership grew to over 200 students.  The Marching Chiefs were also finalists in the Best College Marching Band contest on ABC-TV which established their reputation as one of the nation's finest marching bands. In 1974 the Marching Chiefs gained the title of "world-renowned" as a result of an international performance at the International Trade Fair in Damascus, Syria as a guest of State Department.   While in the Middle East, Chiefs performed in Amman, Jordan as a command performance for King Hussein.

Color guard auxiliary was added in 1970. The 1976 season marked the term of William Raxdale as director of the Chiefs. The step was introduced as part of an overall shift to a strict drum-and-bugle-corps aesthetic in which the Chiefs performed the same show at every game during the '76 football season. While the overall philosophy was not retained, the glide step introduced in that season is still used as a contrasting marching style by the Chiefs.

In 1977 Bentley Shellahamer, a Chiefs alumnus, took over directorship. Shellahamer reinstated the Chiefs' characteristic style of marching while emphasizing flexibility and innovation in matching visuals to music.  In 1978 Chiefs performed their second of many NFL performance during a game for the New Orleans Saints. Chiefs surpassed 300 members during the 1981 football season which was marked by a trip to Ohio State University.  Dr. Whitcomb conducted the combined bands in a performance of the National Anthem which Dr. Shellahamer described as the "ultimate experience." 1981 was also the year that alumnus Dave Westberry took on the role of the "Voice of the Marching Chiefs." The next year Andre Arrouet became interim director while Dr. Shellahamer took leave to work on his doctorate at Ohio State.

In 1982, Sports Illustrated featured the Marching Chiefs in an eight-page photo spread. The magazine echoed a longstanding slogan of the Chiefs in declaring that "Florida State occasionally may lose a football game, but never a halftime show" (December 6, 1982). Also in 1982 was the addition of the yearly Prism Concert to be included with the annual Tri-State Band Festival and Conducting Conference. Dr. Shellahamer resumed directorship in 1984 and Chiefs, along with the Gator Band, performed at Super Bowl XVIII in Tampa, FL. 1988 saw the Marching Chiefs hit another membership milestone when it reached 400 students, thus making Chiefs the world's largest collegiate marching band. In 1989 Chiefs got a new director, Robert Sheldon, and new uniforms. Though not successful at the time, a campaign was launched by band members to designate the Chiefs' practice field "Manley Whitcomb Memorial Field."

1991 began the current era of the Marching Chiefs. Patrick Dunnigan gained directorship of the band and was instrumental in the production of the Chiefs' first CD, Our Best Foot Forward. Though currently commonplace, the CD was the first end-of-season CD recording of a college marching band. The next year was Charlie Carter's 40th year at FSU and was celebrated by a special halftime show in his honor. 1993 was another momentous year, beginning with a trip to East Rutherford, New Jersey for the Kickoff Classic against the University of Kansas Jayhawks.  Doak Campbell Stadium was also renovated before this season including a section was added in the south end zone for the Chiefs and the new "Elephant Doors" underneath the section.  The Homecoming Show celebrated 50 years of bands at FSU. To end the season the Marching Chiefs participated in FSU's first National Championship win over the University of Nebraska Cornhuskers.

The Chiefs renewed their "world renowned" laurels in 1997 when they traveled to London, England to perform a halftime show for a game of the World Football League's London Monarchs.  The following season Dunnigan took leave to pursue a doctorate at the University of Texas and Dr. John L. Baker served as interim director. In 1998 the Marching Chiefs found themselves heading to Tempe, Arizona for another shot at the National championship but lost to the Tennessee Volunteers in the Fiesta Bowl.  The newly hooded Dr. Dunnigan returned for the 1999 season which ended with a National Championship win against the Virginia Tech Hokies in the Sugar Bowl.

In 2002 the Marching Chiefs' practice field was at last officially named in honor of Dr Manley Whitcomb. In 2005 a donation of over $350,000 was made to the university by Bill Harkins, former FSU lacrosse head coach, for a new practice field for The Florida State Lacrosse Team. This allowed Chiefs to start off the '05 season with a new, artificial-turf field for rehearsals. This field, Bill Harkins field at the Manley R. Whitcomb Band Complex, replicated the appearance of Bobby Bowden Field on game day as it appeared in 2005. The turf choice resulted from less-than-ideal conditions faced in rehearsals due to the previous natural grass surface.  In 2009 The Marching Chiefs continued to set records in collegiate band size with 460 members.

Work on the Manley Whitcomb Band Complex was finally completed in time for the 2013 homecoming game. On November 15, 2013 the new field house and ceremonial arch were dedicated by Dr. Dunnigan. The new building will serve as storage facilities for the equipment that the Marching Chiefs use on a daily basis during marching season. As part of an effort to keep the band in tip-top condition, a fund was started in 2013 to replace many of the aging instruments loaned to students who don't own their own.  When the 2013 Seminoles football team made it to the National Championship game the Marching Chiefs traveled with them to Pasadena for the Rose Bowl and contributed to the school's third national championship. In 2018, the Marching Chiefs were invited to perform at the 75th Anniversary of D-Day Parade in Normandy, reclaiming their "World-Renowned" Title.

Try-outs and rehearsals
Aspiring members of the Marching Chiefs complete a week of Preseason Training that begins with a music audition. Following the music audition is a process of learning how to march as a Chief for rookies and a three-day refresher for veterans. After being taught how to march, the week concludes with the marching audition. The playing audition and marching audition each account for 50% of the total audition score which assists in completing the official Marching Chiefs "Block List." Anyone who wishes to be a member of the Marching Chiefs in a given year, new and returning, must audition to be in the band each year.

The band institutes an "alternate" system due to the number of members and the limitations of drill. Members declared alternates share their field position with another member and perform the pregame and/or halftime show every other football game. The number of alternates varies by section and by year.

Marching Chiefs rehearse for two hours on Monday through Friday from 4pm to 6pm. On game days, the band has early morning Continuity rehearsals to review the halftime show and pregame.

Drum majors
Drum Majors and Assistant Drum Majors of the Marching Chiefs fulfill ceremonial as well as musical positions of leadership within the band. One of the most significant and visible responsibilities of the Drum Major is the pre-game strut, which includes a 40-yard strut and mace toss prior to the beginning of the Marching Chiefs' pre-game show. This tradition began with Jim Bruce during his tenure as Drum Major in the late 1970s. Over the years, Marching Chiefs added the position of Assistant Drum Major (and later a second) to serve as an additional field commander and conductor. For halftime and special appearances, the Drum Major dresses in a uniform designed in the likeness of the Seminole Indian Tribe, incorporating designs and colors representative of traditional tribal attire. The current head drum major is Samantha Maltagliati of 2022-2023.

1did not complete season

Sections

The Marching Chiefs' instrumental sections are known by its members by their own specific names and are as follows:

Flutes & Piccolos: "Chiefs Flutes"

Clarinets: "Five Easy Pieces" commonly referred to as "Pieces"

Alto & Tenor Saxophones: "Section X"

Mellophones: "HornZ"

Trumpets: "Screech"

Baritones & Euphoniums: "T.O.N.E." commonly referred to as "Tones"

Trombones: "The Roamin' Bones," commonly referred to as "Bones"

Sousaphones: "The Royal Flush," commonly referred to as "Flush"

Percussion: "The Big 8 Drumline," commonly referred to as "Big 8"

Auxiliary consists of Color Guard, Majorettes and Feature Twirler(s)

Majorettes, commonly referred to as "Rettes"

Each section has its own set of history and traditions, some with their own colors, mottos, symbols, songs, pre-game rituals and/or crests.

FSU Marching Chiefs traditions

"Skull Session" - The Chiefs perform together at a pregame "Skull Session" before each home football game in Tallahassee. When Manley Whitcomb came to Florida State University from Ohio State University he brought several traditions with him, one of those being the "Skull Session." The idea is that the Chiefs get the music into their skulls before the game and can focus more on the marching and visual performance during the game. Originally, Skull Session was held in Opperman Music Hall but has since become a public performance. Now, performing on Mike Martin Field at Dick Howser Stadium (located next to Doak Campbell Stadium), the Chiefs perform section cheers and then go on to give the audience a sneak preview of the day's halftime show selections. Most section cheers tend to be either well-known pop songs, opportunities to poke fun at school opponents/other sections or inside jokes. All cheers are arranged by students who are current/alumni Chiefs.

"Come On and Go" - This is a pregame tradition which the band opens with. The drumline begins by playing the cadence "Come On and Go" as the band "Chief Steps" out onto the field from under the stadium. As the cadence progresses, the band performs a double-time high step known as "Go Cadence" onto the field.

"The Good, The Bad and The Ugly" - This is a tradition that started in the early 1980s when the Chiefs were under the direction of Dr. Bentley Shellahamer. As the Florida State football team was finishing its on-field pre-game warm up routine, the Chiefs joined the team's vocals. As they finished, the players lined up shoulder to shoulder on the fifty-yard line, held up their helmets and walked in a side-by-side line toward the North end zone as the Chiefs played the "main title" theme from the 1966 film "The Good, The Bad and The Ugly" which has been arranged into "G.B.U.", an extended intro which then leads into the playing of the "FSU Fight Song," or the "Warchant". This tradition was retired in 2010, but has since been brought back as of the 2020 Football Season.

"'Flushing' The Field" - The Royal Flush, during every pregame performance, "flushes" the field by running around the Seminole head logo at the center of Bobby Bowden Field while the head drum major stands at the center of it. As the rest of the band transitions to the team entrance formation, The Royal Flush circles the Seminole head. Once The Royal Flush finishes "Flushing" the field, the exit cadence ends. All of Marching Chiefs counts to 24, ending with "Flush".

"Roamin' The Stadium" - The Roamin' Bones "roam" the stadium during 3rd or 4th quarter and perform different arrangements from the Bone Book, their collection of musical charts written specifically for the Roamin' Bones.

"The Hymn To The Garnet & Gold" - Most Chiefs will agree that their favorite school song is what is commonly known as "The Hymn". When Florida State University was looking for an alma mater, several composers sent in their contributions. The Hymn did not make it as the official FSU Alma Mater, but it lives and thrives as a long-standing school tradition, as the Chiefs sing it at the end of every game.

See also
 Florida State Seminoles
 History of Florida State University

References

External links
 FSU Marching Chiefs official website
 FSU Marching Chiefs Alumni Website
 FSU Marching Chiefs Official Twitter
 Sports Illustrated "All Horns Up!!!" photo spread on 1981 Marching Chiefs.  See page 46.

Florida State University
Atlantic Coast Conference marching bands
Musical groups established in 1939
1939 establishments in Florida